Haplochrois hysterota is a moth in the family Elachistidae. It was described by Edward Meyrick in 1918. It is found in South Africa.

References

Natural History Museum Lepidoptera generic names catalog

Endemic moths of South Africa
Moths described in 1918
Elachistidae
Moths of Africa